The 2021 Tajikistan Cup was the 30th edition of the Tajikistan Cup, the knockout football tournament of Tajikistan, with the winner of the cup qualifying for the 2022 AFC Cup.

Format
On 15 May, the preliminary round of the Tajikistan Cup was drawn at the Offices of the Tajikistan Football Federation, with the preliminary round matches taking place on 24 May.

On 12 June, the draw for the Last 16 took place.

On 2 August, the day after the last four of the "Last 16" matches had taken place, the draw for the Quarterfinals was announced.

Teams

Round and draw dates

Preliminary round

Last 16

Quarterfinals

Semifinals

Final

Scorers

4 goals:

 Akbar Bobomurodov – Regar-TadAZ

3 goals:

 Muhammadsharif Saidkhodja – Hulbuk Vose/Ravshan
 Sunatullo Ismoilov – Khatlon

2 goals:

 Jahongir Ergashev – Eskhata
 Ryota Noma – Istiklol
 Manuchekhr Dzhalilov – Istiklol
 Artyom Serdyuk – Khujand
 Nozim Babadjanov – Khujand
 Dilshod Bozorov – Khujand
 Daler Edgorov – Khujand
 Shavkat Khudoynazarov – Panjshir
 Hasan Rustamov – Ravshan
 Himatullo Malodustov – Saroykamar Panj

1 goals:

 Mukhsinjon Abdugafforov – CSKA Pamir
 Shodibek Gafforov – CSKA Pamir
 Umedzhon Kholikov – CSKA Pamir
 Sayyodi Kovussho – CSKA Pamir
 Sharafjon Solekhov – CSKA Pamir
 Dilshod Vasiev – CSKA Pamir
 Farhod Kosimov – Dushanbe-83
 Fakhriddin Akhtamov – Dynamo Dushanbe
 Ahrorjon Inoyatov – Eskhata
 Amirjon Rakhimov – Eskhata
 Rustamjon Saburov – Eskhata
 Akobir Turaev – Eskhata
 Anvar Murodov – Fayzkand
 Amirjon Alikhonov – Hulbuk Vose
 Gurez Aslonov – Hulbuk Vose
 Samariddin Rasulov – Hulbuk Vose
 Saidmukhtor Azimov – Istaravshan
 Ahrorbek Uktamov – Istaravshan
 Salam Ashurmamdov – Istiklol
 Alisher Dzhalilov – Istiklol
 Vahdat Hanonov – Istiklol
 Zoir Juraboev – Istiklol
 Shervoni Mabatshoev – Istiklol
 Manuchehr Safarov – Istiklol
 Rustam Soirov – Istiklol
 Oleksiy Larin – Istiklol
 Andriy Mischenko – Istiklol
 Jen Gaten – Khatlon
 Firdavs Alinazarov – Khatlon
 Komronjon Ismoilov – Khatlon
 Umejon Azizov – Khayr Vahdat
 Faridun Narzulloev – Khayr Vahdat
 Khairullo Azizov – Khosilot Farkhor
 Isroil Somon – Khosilot Farkhor
 Ekhson Boboev – Khujand
 Parviz Bokiev – Khujand
 Komron Tursunov – Khujand
 Daler Yodgorov – Khujand
 Khodzhiboy Ziyoev – Khujand
 Akmal Zulpaliev – Mohir
 Farhojon Boboev – Pakhtakor
 Bahriddin Mukhiddinov – Pakhtakor
 Daler Sharipov – Pakhtakor
 Mahmud Gayurov – Panjshir
 Ziyovuddin Fuzailov – Ravshan
 Avaz Kamchinov – Ravshan
 Kingsley Osei Effah – Ravshan
 Emomali Ahmadkhon – Regar-TadAZ
 Parviz Bakhtiyorzoda – Regar-TadAZ
 Muhammad Burizod – Regar-TadAZ
 Shukhrat Elmurodov – Regar-TadAZ
 Amin Ergashev – Regar-TadAZ
 Shavkati Hotam – Regar-TadAZ
 Firuz Karaev – Regar-TadAZ
 Azizbek Khaitov – Regar-TadAZ
 Sherzod Makhamadiev – Regar-TadAZ
 Alisher Sharipov – Regar-TadAZ
 Munis Rasulov – Saroykamar Panj

Own goals:

See also
2021 Tajikistan Higher League
2021 Tajikistan First League

External links

Tajikistan Cup News

References

Tajikistan Cup
Tajikistan
Cup